Profundisepta profundi is a species of sea snail, a marine gastropod mollusk in the family Fissurellidae, the keyhole limpets.

Description
The shell size varies between 3 mm and 6 mm

Distribution
This species is distributed in the Northern Atlantic Ocean along Iceland and Greenland.

References

 Mayhew, R. and F. Cole. 1994 MS. A taxonomic discussion and update of shell-bearing marine molluscs recorded from NW Atlantic North of Cape Cod (excluding Greenland), and Canadian Arctic Archipeligo
 Gofas, S.; Le Renard, J.; Bouchet, P. (2001). Mollusca, in: Costello, M.J. et al. (Ed.) (2001). European register of marine species: a check-list of the marine species in Europe and a bibliography of guides to their identification. Collection Patrimoines Naturels, 50: pp. 180–213

External links
  Serge GOFAS, Ángel A. LUQUE, Joan Daniel OLIVER,José TEMPLADO & Alberto SERRA (2021) - The Mollusca of Galicia Bank (NE Atlantic Ocean); European Journal of Taxonomy 785: 1–114
 

Fissurellidae
Gastropods described in 1877
Taxa named by John Gwyn Jeffreys